The Sun 'n Lake of Sebring improvement district is a special district and unincorporated community in Highlands County, Florida, United States. It is located northwest of Sebring, off US 27. It has a similar name to nearby Sun 'n Lakes South, a subdivision south of Lake Placid, also in Highlands County.

The Sun 'n Lake of Sebring community is home to two 18-hole golf courses: Deer Run and Turtle Run.

Sun 'n Lake of Sebring operates under a general manager appointed by an elected five-member board of supervisors. There is also a wilderness preserve area called Sun 'n Lake Preserve to the west

References

External links
 

Unincorporated communities in Highlands County, Florida
Unincorporated communities in Florida